The slender sunfish (Ranzania laevis) is a mola of the family Molidae, the only extant member of the genus Ranzania, found globally in tropical and temperate seas. Its length is up to 1 m (3.3 ft). Several stranding and mass stranding events have occurred on beaches near Albany, Western Australia. 

The first South Australian specimen was found at Aldinga in 1944. A cast was made from it, and a replica was made, painted and prepared for display at the South Australian museum that year. Several other individuals have stranded in South Australia at Port Willunga, Netley and West Beach with the latter successfully returned live to deeper water.

The body of this fish gives the appearance of the side view of a larger shark (an optical illusion underwater). This is most likely to ward off any would be predators.

In contrast to its much larger relatives in the family Molidae, who are very slow-moving and mostly feed upon jellyfish, salps, and small fish and crustaceans, the slender sunfish is known to mainly feed upon squid, particularly of the family Ommastrephidae, which are known for being very fast-moving, displaying evidence that the slender sunfish itself is a faster-moving and agile predator of squid.

Gallery

References

Abu El-Regal and El-Moselhy. 2013. The first record of slender sunfish, Ranzania laevis from the Red Sea. Journal of Fish Biology.     Journal of Fish Biology 83(5):1425-9

    DOI: 10.1111/jfb.12226

slender sunfish
Cosmopolitan fish
slender sunfish
Taxa named by Thomas Pennant